Anthony Petch Ampaipitakwong (born 14 June 1988) is a former professional footballer who played as a defensive midfielder. Born in the United States, he represented the Thailand national team.

Personal life
Anthony was born in Carrollton, Texas. His mother is American and his father is Thai. From 2003–05, Ampaipitakwong was a part of the United States U-17 national team Residency program in Bradenton, Florida.

College and amateur
While a student at the University of Akron, Ampaipitakwong helped the Akron Zips men's soccer team, coached by Caleb Porter, to their first national championship in 2010 with a win in the College Cup Final against Louisville. He was on the Hermann Trophy Watch List and was a College Soccer News Preseason All-American. He was a co-captain on a team that lost two games over two years. He was a National Soccer Coaches Association of America (NSCAA) First Team All-American and a Soccer America MVP First Team selection in 2009. He was the winner of the NCAA Senior CLASS Award in 2010.

Ampaipitakwong  started all 93 games he appeared in over his four-year career at Akron, scoring 17 goals with 30 assists. In his senior season, he scored three goals and had a career high 11 assists.

During his college years Ampaipitakwong also played with the Bradenton Academics in the USL Premier Development League, scoring 6 goals in 45 league appearances over four seasons with the team.

Club career
Ampaipitakwong was selected by the San Jose Earthquakes in the second round of the 2011 MLS SuperDraft (33rd overall). He signed with the club on March 1, 2011, and made his professional debut on March 19 in the first game of the 2011 MLS season, a 1–0 loss to Real Salt Lake. In June 2012, Ampaipitakwong signed a 2.5 year contract with Thai Premier League side Buriram United. In the second leg of the 2013 Thai Premier League Ampaipitakwong was bought from Buriram United by Bangkok United and signed a 2.5 year deal. 

On 19 March 2022, Ampaipitakwong came to watch the Thai League game, where Bangkok United beat Chiangrai United 3-0 before bid farewell to teammates and club fans after deciding to officially retired from professional footballer and will travel back to his hometown in Carrollton, Texas, USA.

International career
Ampaipitakwong represented the United States under-17 national team.

He represented the Thailand national football team, as his father is Thai. He played his first match with the Thai national team in the match against Qatar on March 17, 2013.

Statistics

International

Honors

University of Akron
 NCAA Men's Division I Soccer Championship (1): 2010

Buriram United
 Thai FA Cup (1): 2012
 Thai League Cup (1): 2012
 Kor Royal Cup (1): 2013

References

External links
 
 Anthony Ampaipitakwong profile at the Bangkok United website
 
 Anthony Ampaipitakwong Interview 

1988 births
Living people
People from Carrollton, Texas
American sportspeople of Thai descent
Anthony Ampaipitakwong
American soccer players
Anthony Ampaipitakwong
Association football midfielders
USL League Two players
Soccer players from Texas
Sportspeople from the Dallas–Fort Worth metroplex
Akron Zips men's soccer players
IMG Academy Bradenton players
Major League Soccer players
San Jose Earthquakes players
Anthony Ampaipitakwong
Anthony Ampaipitakwong
Anthony Ampaipitakwong
Anthony Ampaipitakwong
United States men's youth international soccer players
Anthony Ampaipitakwong
San Jose Earthquakes draft picks
All-American men's college soccer players
Thai expatriate sportspeople in the United States